Stoute may refer to:

 Jennifer Stoute (born 1965), English sprinter
 Kevin Stoute (born 1985), Barbadian cricketer
 Michael Stoute (born 1945), Barbadian racehorse trainer
 Michael Stoute (cyclist) (born 1948), Barbadian cyclist